The 2021 Bunnings NPC season was the sixteenth season of New Zealand's provincial rugby union competition since it turned professional in 2006. The regular season began on August 6, when Manawatu hosted Counties Manukau. It involved the top fourteen rugby unions of New Zealand. For sponsorship reasons, the competition was known as the Bunnings NPC and it was the first season under the lead sponsor and to carry the NPC moniker since 2005. The winner of the Championship, Taranaki wasn't promoted to the Premiership due to a format restructure earlier in the season. The seventh placed Premiership team, Auckland wasn't relegated to the Championship after not being able to compete after the resurgence of COVID-19 in the Auckland region.

Format
The Bunnings NPC standings were sorted by a competition points system. Four points were awarded to the winning team, a draw equaled two points, whilst a loss amounted to zero points. Unions could also win their side a respectable bonus point. To receive a bonus point, they must have scored four tries or more or lose by seven or fewer points or less. Each team was placed on their total points received. If necessary of a tiebreaker, when two or more teams finish on equal points, the union who defeated the other in a head-to-head got placed higher. In case of a draw between them, the side with the biggest points deferential margin got rights to be ranked above. If they were tied on points difference, it was then decided by a highest scored try count or a coin toss. This seeding format was implemented since the beginning of the 2006 competition.

The competition included a promotion-relegation process with the winner of the Championship receiving automatic promotion to the Premiership, replacing the seventh-placed team in the Premiership which was relegated to the Championship for the following year. The regular season consisted of two types of matches. The internal division matches were when each team played the other six unions in their division once, home or away. The cross-division matches were when each team played four teams from the other division, thus missing out on three teams, each from the opposite division. Each union played home or away games against teams from the other division, making a total of ten competition games for each union. The finals format allowed the top four teams from each division move on to the semi-finals. The top two division winners, based on table points, received a home semi-final. In the first round of the finals, the semi-finals, the second division winner hosted the third division winner, and the first division winner hosted the fourth division winner. The final was hosted by the top remaining seed.

Standings
Source: Bunnings NPC standings 2021

Standings progression

Regular season
The 2021 Bunnings NPC was originally scheduled to play across ten weeks. The competition started on Friday, August 6, with Manawatu taking on Counties Manukau at Central Energy Trust Arena. On August 18, New Zealand Rugby announced that all rugby in New Zealand would be postponed due to the COVID-19 pandemic. In September it was confirmed the competition schedule would continue from Week 7 of the original draw. Auckland, Counties Manukau, Manawatu, North Harbour, Otago, and Southland would have byes due to covid restrictions. Therefore all rugby matches scheduled between the 20th and 29 August and 3rd to the 5th of September 2021 was postponed.

On 7 October 2021, it was later revealed the Auckland based teams, Auckland, Counties Manukau, and North Harbour would be withdrawn from the competition after being declined its third travel exemption application. A new draw was released for the remainding four weeks of the season. In addition non-competition matches were implemented so that teams that would have otherwise played Auckland region teams don't go two weeks without a match. These matches will not receive competition points.

Week 1

Week 2

Week 3

Week 4

Week 5

Week 6

Week 7

Week 8

Week 9

Week 10

Play-offs

Semi-finals

Finals

{| border="0" style="width:100%;"
|-
|

Statistics

Leading point scorers

Source: The weekly reviews of the matches published on provincial.rugby (see "Report" in the individual match scoring stats).

Leading try scorers

Source: The weekly reviews of the matches published on provincial.rugby (see "Report" in the individual match scoring stats).

Points by week

Source: Bunnings NPC Fixtures and Results 2021

Tries by week

Source: The weekly reviews of the matches published on provincial.rugby (see "Report" in the individual match scoring stats).

Sanctions

Ranfurly Shield

Pre-season challenges
For the 2021 pre-season, Hawke's Bay accepted Ranfurly Shield challenges from North Otago and Ngāti Porou East Coast. In their first defence on June 30, Hawke's Bay defeated North Otago 85–0 in Napier. The side scored thirteen tries to none. It began with a try to Kienan Higgins on debut from a turnover after four minutes. North Otago then conceded a penalty try and lost lock Manulua Taiti to a yellow card. Hawke’s Bay added a further two tries from Jason Long to lead twenty-eight points to nil after the first quarter. Another two tries in the last eight minutes gave Hawke's Bay a forty-two point lead at halftime. Hawke's Bay also gave a debut to All Black family member Sir Brian Lochore's grandson, Frank Lochore.

In Hawke's Bay's second defence of the year they scored fifteen tries to win 93–5 against Ngāti Porou East Coast. Hawke's Bay number 8 Gareth Evans opened the scoring off due to lineout maul five minutes into the first half. Hawke's Bay had their second try through Josh Kaifa after some good runs from Anzelo Tuitavuki and Dennon Robinson-Bartlett on either wing, then fullback Danny Toala crossed over to make it seventeen points to nil inside fifteen minutes. Kaifa, Toala, Tuitavuki, Lincoln McClutchie and replacement prop Pouri Rakete-Stones all crossed for doubles, with McClutchie kicking nine conversions in a personal tally of twenty-eight points. Ngāti Porou East Coast were coached by former New Zealand international Hosea Gear and scored their only try to hooker Jorian Tangaere in the thirtieth minute.

References

External links

National Provincial Championship
Mitre 10 Cup
Mitre 10 Cup